Saccharopolyspora halotolerans is a halophilic bacterium from the genus Saccharopolyspora which has been isolated from soil from the salt lake Lop Nur in Xinjiang in China.

References

 

Pseudonocardineae
Bacteria described in 2014
Halophiles